John Cotes may refer to:

 John Cotes (died 1821), British MP
 John Cotes (died 1874), his son, also an MP

See also
John Coates (disambiguation)